Weaver Vale is a constituency in Cheshire represented in the House of Commons of the UK Parliament since 2017 by Mike Amesbury, a member of the Labour Party.

Constituency profile
The constituency takes its name from the River Weaver, which flows through the area, and much of the area was part of the former district of Vale Royal. It covers the northern part of the Cheshire West and Chester unitary authority in Cheshire, including the towns of Northwich and Frodsham and the villages of Helsby and Weaverham. It also includes part of the Borough of Halton, covering the eastern half of Runcorn.

The area has economic sectors as diverse as plastics and chemicals to construction.  Other areas include telecommunications/bank communication centres, with in addition, a large national bakery and a supermarket distribution centre.  Salt used to comprise a major mining industry of the area, much more of which is extracted today from large reserves in Northern Ireland.  Workless claimants who were registered jobseekers were in November 2012 slightly higher than the national average of 3.8%, at 4.1% of the population based on a statistical compilation by The Guardian.  This was, however, lower than the regional average of 4.4%. Northwich and the wards from Halton are inclined to vote Labour, whereas Frodsham, Helsby and the smaller rural villages are more Conservative.

Creation 
Weaver Vale was created for the 1997 general election from parts of Eddisbury, Tatton, Halton, and Warrington South, when the number of constituencies in Cheshire was increased from 10 to 11.

Boundaries

1997–2010: The District of Vale Royal wards of Castle, Church, Forest, Frodsham East, Frodsham North West, Frodsham South, Gorst Wood, Hartford, Helsby Central, Helsby North, Helsby South and Alvanley Ward, Kingsley, Milton, Northwich, Weaver, Winnington, Witton North, and Witton South, and the Borough of Halton wards of Brookfields, Castlefields, Clough, Daresbury, Murdishaw, and Norton.

Norton and Daresbury were transferred from Warrington South, with other parts of Halton coming from the constituency thereof. Frodsham, Helsby and Weaverham were transferred from Eddisbury and Northwich had previously been part of Tatton.

2010–2019: The Parliamentary Constituencies (England) Order 2007 defined the boundaries as:

The Borough of Halton wards of Beechwood, Daresbury, Halton Lea, Norton North, Norton South, and Windmill Hill, and the Borough of Vale Royal wards of Forest, Frodsham North, Frodsham South, Hartford & Whitegate, Helsby, Kingsley, Leftwich & Kingsmead, Milton Weaver, Northwich Castle, Northwich Winnington, Northwich Witton, and Weaverham.

Halton Borough ward of Castlefields transferred to Halton constituency. Other minor changes due to revision of ward boundaries.

However, before the new boundaries came into force for the 2010 election, the districts making up the county of Cheshire were abolished on 1 April 2009, being replaced by four unitary authorities. Consequently, the constituency's boundaries became:

The Cheshire West and Chester wards of Davenham & Moulton (part), Frodsham, Gowy (part), Hartford & Greenbank, Helsby, Kingsley, Weaver & Cuddington (part), Winsford Over & Verdin (part), Winnington & Castle, and Witton & Rudheath (part), and the Borough of Halton wards of Beechwood, Daresbury, Halton Lea, Norton North, Norton South, and Windmill Hill.

2019–present: Following a further local government ward boundary review in 2019, the boundaries are currently:

The Cheshire West and Chester wards of Davenham, Moulton & Kingsmead (part), Frodsham, Hartford & Greenbank, Helsby, Marbury (part), Northwich Leftwich, Northwich Winnington & Castle, Northwich Witton,  Rudheath (part), Sandstone (part), Weaver & Cuddington (part), and Winsford Over & Verdin (part), and the Borough of Halton wards of Beechwood, Daresbury, Halton Lea, Norton North, Norton South, and Windmill Hill.

Political history
From the 1997 general election, the new seat was held by the Labour Party's Mike Hall, who had first entered Parliament in 1992 for Warrington South.  Labour held the seat relatively easily in the succeeding two general elections. In February 2010 Hall announced that he was standing down at the 2010 election due to health reasons. Graham Evans (Conservative) gained the seat at the 2010 election on a swing of 8.15% with minor boundary changes mentioned likely affecting this swing.

The present MP, Mike Amesbury, regained the seat for Labour at the 2017 general election and was returned with a reduced majority in 2019.

Weaver Vale was one of seven seats won (held or gained) by a Labour candidate in 2017 from a total of 11 covering its county. Amesbury's 2017 win was one of 30 net gains of the Labour Party, three of which came from the county Cheshire.

The seat has been considered relative to others a marginal seat since 2005 as its winner's majority has not exceeded 7.8% of the vote since the 17.4% majority won in 2005 and the seat has changed hands twice since that year.

Members of Parliament

Elections

Elections in the 2010s

Elections in the 2000s

Elections in the 1990s

See also

 List of parliamentary constituencies in Cheshire
History of parliamentary constituencies and boundaries in Cheshire

Notes

References

Parliamentary constituencies in Cheshire
Constituencies of the Parliament of the United Kingdom established in 1997